Richard Scannell (May 12, 1845 – January 8, 1916) was an Irish-born prelate of the Roman Catholic Church. He served as bishop of the Diocese of Concordia in Kansas (1887–1891) and as bishop of the Diocese of Omaha in Nebraska (1891–1916).

Biography

Early life 
Richard Scannell was born on May 12, 1845, in Cloyne, County Cork, in Ireland to Patrick and Johanna (née Collins) Scannell. After completing his classical studies in a private school at Midleton, Ireland, he entered All Hallows College in Dublin in 1866.

Scannell was ordained to the priesthood for the Diocese of Nashville in Tennessee, on February 26, 1871. He arrived in the United States later in 1871 and was appointed as  a curate at Holy Rosary Cathedral.  In 1878, he became pastor of St. Columba's Parish in East Nashville. He returned to the cathedral as rector in 1879.

Following the transfer of Bishop Patrick Feehan to the Archdiocese of Chicago, Scannell served as apostolic administrator for the diocese from 1880 to 1883. After a leave of absence for health reasons, he organized St. Joseph's Parish in West Nashville and built its church in 1885. In August 1886, Scannell was appointed vicar general of the diocese.

Bishop of Concordia 
On August 9, 1887, Scannell was appointed as the first bishop of the newly erected Diocese of Concordia by Pope Leo XIII. He received his episcopal consecration on  November 30, 1887, from Archbishop Feehan, with Bishops William McCloskey and Joseph Rademacher serving as co-consecrators, at St. Joseph's Church. 

With only 20 resident pastors and a growing Catholic population, Scannell attempted to solve the priest shortage by establishing a preparatory seminary in Belleville, Kansas, laying its cornerstone in June 1890. However, due to an economic depression, the seminary was never built and left a long-lasting debt. During his three-year-long tenure, Scannell also assisted the Sisters of St. Joseph to become permanently established in the diocese, erected fifteen churches, and increased the number of diocesan priests from five to twenty-two.

Bishop of Omaha 
Scannell was named by Leo XIII to succeed Bishop James O'Connor as bishop of the Diocese of Omaha on January 30, 1891. Under his governance, the cornerstone of St. Cecilia Cathedral was laid in 1907. He also oversaw the diocese's expansion to 95 parishes, serving more than 80,000 Catholics. Parochial schools and diocesan priests more than doubled in number, and increases were also made among religious. Scannell erected the Creighton Memorial St. Joseph's Hospital in Omaha and St. Catherine's Hospital, and a home of the Good Shepherd. He also introduced the Third Order Regular of St. Francis, Sisters of St. Joseph, Presentation Sisters, Sisters of the Resurrection, Sisters of St. Benedict, Sisters of the Blessed Sacrament, Good Shepherd Sisters, the Dominicans, Felicians, Ursulines, and Franciscans to the diocese.

Richard Scannell died on January 8, 1916, in Omaha at age 70.

References

1845 births
1916 deaths
People from County Cork
Irish emigrants to the United States (before 1923)
Alumni of All Hallows College, Dublin
Irish Roman Catholic missionaries
American Roman Catholic clergy of Irish descent
Roman Catholic bishops of Concordia
Roman Catholic bishops of Omaha
Catholic Church in Tennessee
Catholic Church in Nebraska
Roman Catholic missionaries in the United States
20th-century Roman Catholic bishops in the United States